The 1975 NBA World Championship Series was the championship round of the 1974–75 NBA season of the National Basketball Association. The Western Conference champion Golden State Warriors (48–34) played against the Eastern Conference champion Washington Bullets (60–22) for the championship. The series was played under a best-of-seven format. The underdog Warriors won in four games, sweeping the heavily-favored Bullets to take the title. Warriors small forward Rick Barry was named as the series MVP.

The Warriors' home games were played at the Cow Palace in Daly City (near San Francisco) due to scheduling conflicts at their normal home court of Oakland Arena during the week of May 19–26. In addition, an odd scheduling format had to be used because Golden State could not secure the Cow Palace for Memorial Day Weekend (May 24–26). A Sports Illustrated article about the series reported that Washington, which held home court advantage, was given the option of a 1-2-2-1-1 scheduling format due to Golden State's problems or, if they wished, opening on the road and then having Games 2, 3, and 4 at home. Washington opted for the 1-2-2-1-1 format not out of a sense of fairness, but because they wanted to open the series at home.

The series is notable as it was the first championship game or series in any of the major U.S. professional sports leagues to feature two African American head coaches or managers, as Al Attles coached the Warriors and K. C. Jones coached the Bullets.

Background

Golden State Warriors

In the years since, they moved to Oakland, briefly lost Rick Barry to the American Basketball Association, and named Warriors great Al Attles as head coach. Before the start of the 1974–75 season they traded future Hall of Famer Nate Thurmond to the Chicago Bulls for young center Clifford Ray. They also drafted Jamaal Wilkes, then known as Keith Wilkes, out of UCLA. With Barry as the offensive leader, and with Attles using a team approach to coaching, the Warriors managed to finish the season atop the Western Conference with 48 wins. In the playoffs, they defeated the Seattle SuperSonics in six games, then eliminated Thurmond and the Bulls in seven games to advance to the Finals.

Washington Bullets

The Washington Bullets were in their second season in the Washington Metropolitan Area, having moved from Baltimore prior to the 1973–74 season. The Bullets, led by Wes Unseld and Elvin Hayes, and coached by K. C. Jones, won 60 games that season, then overcame the Buffalo Braves and the defending champion Boston Celtics in seven and six games, respectively.

Road to the Finals

Regular season series
Washington won the regular season series 3–1.

Series summary

Golden State wins the series, 4–0.

This was the first time in NBA Finals history in which the team who did not have home court advantage swept the series. This has happened only one time since, in 1995, when the Houston Rockets swept the Orlando Magic.

Game summaries

Game 1

Opting to open the series at home, the Bullets built a 14-point lead at the half over the Warriors at the Capital Centre. The Warriors began to storm back, with Phil Smith coming off the bench to score 20 points in 31 minutes of playing time, as Golden State took the first game, 101–95.

Game 2

Instead of their familiar Oakland Coliseum Arena, the Warriors were forced to play their first two scheduled home games of the series at the nearby Cow Palace (the Oakland facility being unavailable due to the Ice Follies). The Bullets jumped to an early 13-point lead, but Golden State battled back, led by 36 points from Rick Barry, to take a 92–91 lead in the closing seconds. Washington got the ball back with six seconds left but missed two shots and now were down 2–0.

Game 3

Rick Barry poured in 38 points and backup center George Johnson had 10 points and nine rebounds off the bench to help the Warriors to a key Game 3 109–101 win.

Two major factors enabling the Warriors to take an insurmountable lead were the defensive play of the seemingly undersized Jamaal Wilkes on Bullets' power forward Elvin Hayes and the play of the Warrior bench. In three games, Hayes had only 29 points and the Warriors' bench players had outscored the Bullets' reserves 115-53.

Game 4

Back at home, the Bullets seemed to be on their way to staving off an unexpected sweep by the underdog Warriors, leading by 14 points early on. Bullets forward Mike Riordan was assigned to guard Barry, who had killed the Bullets in the series up to that point by averaging 35 points a game. Riordan played Barry very physically, arousing the ire of Warriors' coach Al Attles. Midway through the first quarter, Barry went on a drive to the basket and was fouled hard from behind by Riordan. Barry reacted with a shove, but Attles bolted onto the court and initiated a fight of his own with Riordan, thereby protecting his star player from an ejection and getting ejected himself. The remainder of the game was directed by assistant coach Joe Roberts.

The Bullets controlled the game and led most of the way, leading by as many as eight in the fourth quarter at 90-82 after a Riordan drive and layup where he injured his ankle.  Bullets coach K.C. Jones pulled Riordan and sent in little-used Dick Gibbs, with Nick Weatherspoon mired in a shooting slump.  Barry and Hayes exchanged baskets, keeping the Bullets up by eight at 92-84. After a Jamaal Wilkes basket, Kevin Porter missed a pair of free throws and Butch Beard hit a jumper to cut the Bullet lead to four at 92-88.  Porter then threw away an easy pass on the Bullets' next trip, and Wilkes canned a jumper to cut it to two at 92-90.  Porter missed a layup, and then Wilkes hit a rebound basket to tie the score.  Hayes, who had only 15 points, then hit one of two to give the lead back to the Bullets.  Beard answered with a drive and basket to give the Warriors a 94-93 lead.  Unseld then threw away an easy bounce pass to give the ball back to the Warriors with 1:26 left.  With 1:08 left, Barry put up a jumper and missed, and Hayes hit a wide-open Gibbs with an outlet pass, but Gibbs blew the layup.  The Warriors turned the ball over on a 24-second violation with 33 seconds left, but the Bullets gave it back to them after a timeout when Unseld fumbled an inbounds pass into the backcourt.  Beard then hit one of two, then one of three to give the Warriors their final margin.

Television coverage
CBS broadcast the 1975 NBA Finals in the United States, with Brent Musburger on play-by-play and Oscar Robertson on color commentary. With Rick Barry playing for the Warriors in this series, the recently-retired Robertson filled his spot; Barry went on to cover the next six NBA Finals, five of which while still an active player. The 1975 Finals is also the oldest NBA championship series whose TV coverage still exists in its entirety, as do all subsequent Finals (except 1978, which has three of its seven contests missing).

Aftermath
The Washington Bullets would re-appear in the NBA Finals in 1978 and 1979 against the Seattle SuperSonics, with a series win in seven games and a series loss in five games respectively.

The Golden State Warriors would only win their next championship 40 years later in  against the Cleveland Cavaliers in six games, ending the longest drought between championships in NBA history.

Team rosters

Golden State Warriors

Washington Bullets

See also
1975 NBA Playoffs
1974-75 NBA season

External links
Game 2 from nbatube.com

References

National Basketball Association Finals
NBA
NBA
Finals
NBA Finals
NBA Finals
Basketball competitions in Washington, D.C.
Basketball competitions in Oakland, California
20th century in Oakland, California
NBA Finals